Angela Brooks FAIA is an American architect based in Los Angeles, California. She is the Co-Principal of the Los Angeles-based architecture firm, Brooks + Scarpa. She co-founded and served as President of Livable Places, a nonprofit development company created to stimulate neighborhood revitalization in Los Angeles.

Significant works 
Brooks was the project architect for Pugh + Scarpa's project Colorado Court in Santa Monica, which was the first multi-family housing project in the USA to be LEED certified. It has 46 units. It is the first large residential complex in the United States to combine advanced sustainability with low-income housing. In continuing her commitment to socially progressive design, the program was designed for homeless residents with chronic mental illness as a gathering spot to create a sense of community.

Awards and honors 
Brooks is the recipient of the 2022 American Institute of Architects Gold Medal  the institutes highest honor. In 2020, Brooks received The Maybeck Award, California's highest honor from the American Institute of Architects California.  She is the first woman to receive the award. She was a 2009 National American Institute of Architects Young Architects Award recipient, having made an "exceptional" contribution to architecture early in her career. She is a Fellow of the American Institute of Architects. Brooks was also the 2010 honoree of the “Character Approved” Award by USA Network for her “unparalleled ability to marry aesthetics, affordability and sustainability in the built environment”, USA Network officials said. "As buildings are among the chief contributors to energy consumption and landfill waste, the role and the voice of the architect in the future of our planet is a vital one. I hope that this feature will help me raise awareness of the issues of sustainability that have been the main objects of my career." Brooks was a recipient 2010 American Institute of Architects Firm Award.

Brooks + Scarpa was the winner of the 2014 Smithsonian Cooper-Hewitt National Design Museum Award in Architecture.

Brooks was featured in the book Woman in Green: Voices of Sustainable Design.

Brooks and Scarpa won 2019 Marvin Hall of Fame.

Personal life
Brooks is married to the American architect Lawrence Scarpa, partner in Brooks + Scarpa. Brooks met Scarpa at the University of Florida.

References

Living people
Architects from Los Angeles
Fellows of the American Institute of Architects
American women architects
21st-century American architects
Year of birth missing (living people)
21st-century American women

External links

 Angela Brooks Official Bio